Chickens is a British sitcom that was first broadcast on Channel 4 as a television pilot on 2 September 2011, as part of the channel's Comedy Showcase season of comedy pilots. It was then followed by a six-episode series that was commissioned on Sky 1 and broadcast between 22 August and 26 September 2013. The show is about three men who don’t go off to fight in the First World War and consequently become social outcasts in their village. It was nominated for Best Comedy Programme at the 2014 Broadcast Awards.

Cast and characters
 Simon Bird as Cecil: A young man who was rejected from the war due to his flat feet.
 Joe Thomas as George: a young man who refuses to participate in the war and in violence altogether.
 Jonny Sweet as Bert: the dimwitted man of the trio of Chickens. Bert does tend to forget that the war is actually going on.
 Sarah Daykin as Winky: George's fiancée
 Emerald Fennell as Agnes, Cecil's sister
 Louise Ford as Gracie
 Amy Dawson as Dot
 Vicki Pepperdine as Hesta
 Eileen Davies as Gladys
 Emma Fryer as Nellie
 Barry Humphries as Mr. Armstrong, the local headmaster
 Ellie Kendrick as Constance

Pilot
The pilot episode was filmed partly on location in the village of Finchingfield in Essex, shooting exterior scenes in the square, the school and the church yard.

Episodes

References

External links

2010s British sitcoms
2013 British television series debuts
2013 British television series endings
Comedy Showcase
Sky sitcoms